Fractional-order control (FOC) is a field of control theory that uses the fractional-order integrator as part of the control system design toolkit. The use of fractional calculus (FC) can improve and generalize well-established control methods and strategies. 

The fundamental advantage of FOC is that the fractional-order integrator weights history using a function that decays with a power-law tail. The effect is that the effects of all time are computed for each iteration of the control algorithm. This creates a 'distribution of time constants,' the upshot of which is there is no particular time constant, or resonance frequency, for the system.

In fact, the fractional integral operator  is different from any integer-order rational transfer function , in the sense that it is a non-local operator that possesses an infinite memory and takes into account the whole history of its input signal.

Fractional-order control shows promise in many controlled environments that suffer from the classical problems of overshoot and resonance, as well as time diffuse applications such as thermal dissipation and chemical mixing. Fractional-order control has also been demonstrated to be capable of suppressing chaotic behaviors in mathematical models of, for example, muscular blood vessels.

Initiated from the 80's by the Pr. Oustaloup's group, the CRONE approach is one of the most developed control-system design methodologies that uses fractional-order operator properties.

See also
Differintegral
Fractional calculus
Fractional-order system

External links
 Dr. YangQuan Chen's latest homepage for the applied fractional calculus (AFC)
 Dr. YangQuan Chen's page about fractional calculus on Google Sites

References

Control theory
Cybernetics